Kristian Lien (10 May 1915 – 20 May 1996) was a Norwegian politician for the Christian Democratic Party.

He grew up in Bergen, but settled at Bygstad. He served as mayor of Gaular municipality, and was a member of Sogn og Fjordane county council from 1968 to 1975. He served as a deputy representative to the Norwegian Parliament from Sogn og Fjordane during the term 1969–1973.

References
Kristian Lien at NRK Sogn og Fjordane County Encyclopedia 

1915 births
1996 deaths
Christian Democratic Party (Norway) politicians
Deputy members of the Storting
Mayors of places in Sogn og Fjordane